Andy Singer is an American political cartoonist born in 1965. He began publishing cartoons in 1992 in University of California Berkeley's student newspaper, The Daily Californian. Since 1992, his cartoons have appeared in hundreds of newspapers, magazines, websites, books and exhibitions around the world. These include The New Yorker, The New York Times, Funny Times, Z magazine, La Décroissance, Neweekly (in China), Boston.com, Forbes.com, NPR.org, NBC.com, Bloomberg.com, Wired.com, a 2021-22 outdoor exhibit on the Artwall Gallery in Prague, and a major outdoor exhibit on Paulista Avenue in Sao Paulo Brazil, as part of Virada Sustentável in 2020.

He's the author of 4 books. The first, CARtoons (2001, Car Busters Press), has been translated into several languages, including French (Echappe, 2007) and a Portuguese language edition, published by Autonomia Literária in Brazil in 2017. His second book, Attitude Featuring Andy Singer NO EXIT (2004, Nantier Beall Minoustchine Publishing) was part of series of books by NBM publishing, edited by fellow cartoonist Ted Rall. His third book was Ils M'Énervent (Mais Je Garde Mon Calme) (2006, Berg International Éditeurs), a compilation of cartoons, translated into French. His most recent book was Why We Drive, published in 2013 by Microcosm Publishing.

His work has also appeared in numerous cartoon compilations. These include "Long Story Short" (Akashic Books, 2020), "Treasury of Mini Comics, Volume 1" (Fantagraphics Books, 2013), "Superheroes Strip Artists, & Talking Animals" (Minnesota Historical Society Press, 2011), and "Attitude: The New Subversive Political Cartoonists" (NBM Publishing 2002).

Andy grew up in New York City and Berkeley, California and graduated from Cornell University with bachelors degrees in Fine Arts and Art History. He currently lives in Saint Paul, Minnesota and serves as volunteer co-chair of the Saint Paul Bicycle Coalition.

References

External links 

 
 Andy Singer on Cagle

American editorial cartoonists
Artists from Saint Paul, Minnesota
Anti-consumerists
Neo-Luddites
1965 births
Living people